Larry Scott may refer to:

 Larry Scott (bodybuilder) (1938–2014), American professional bodybuilder
 Larry Scott (radio personality) (1938-2016), American country music disc jockey
 Larry Scott (sailor) (born 1947), Canadian Olympic sailor
 Larry Scott (sports administrator) (born 1964), American sports administrator and former professional tennis player
 Larry Scott (American football) (born 1977), American football coach
 Larry B. Scott (born 1961), American actor
 Larry R. Scott, American businessman and member of the New Mexico House of Representatives

See also
Lawrence Scott (disambiguation)
Laurie Scott (disambiguation)